Eleonore Schoenfeld (March 6, 1925 – January 1, 2007) was an American musician, considered one of the most influential cellists of the 20th century.

Biography
Born in Maribor, Slovenia to a Polish father and a Russian mother, Schoenfeld moved to Berlin with her family at age six. She proceeded to study ballet, violin, and piano before switching to cello at age eleven. Her first teacher was Karl Niedermeyer, a pupil of Hugo Becker, with whom she studied until age fourteen. From there she entered the prestigious Hochschule für Musik in Berlin - eighteen being the traditional age of entry. She then spent the next four years studying with Adolf Steiner, a well-known soloist.

In 1952, Schoenfeld's parents, wary of the Russian dictatorship, led the Schoenfeld family to flee to the United States. From there, a connection from the Idyllwild Arts Academy led the then-dean of the USC Thornton School of Music to ask her, and her sister Alice, a concert violinist, to join the faculty. The "Schoenfeld Duo" remained there since, serving alongside Gregor Piatigorsky, Jascha Heifetz, and many other distinguished musicians.

Through the span of her career, Schoenfeld produced over 200 recordings, recorded by the BBC.

Her students have become top prizewinners in competitions such as Geneva, the Casals Competition (Budapest), Tchaikovsky (Russia), Markneukirchen (Germany), Antonio Janigro (Croatia), and the Concert Artist Guild (U.S.). Her students have also performed repeatedly as soloists with the New York Philharmonic, Los Angeles Philharmonic, Los Angeles Chamber Orchestra, Georgian Chamber Orchestra (former Soviet republic of Georgia), Slovenian Philharmonic, and Bamberg Symphony Orchestra (Germany) with such eminent conductors as Zubin Mehta, Horst Stein, Esa-Pekka Salonen, Gerard Schwarz and Carl St. Clair.

In 2008, PBS made an hour-long documentary titled "Born to Teach" about Eleonore Schoenfeld's life.

Schoenfeld died January 1, 2007 at the home she shared with her sister and is interred at the Mountain View Cemetery Mortuary, Altadena, California.

Awards
USC Dean's Award for Excellence in Teaching, 2004
USC Ramo Music Faculty Award
Indiana University Grand Dame du Violoncelle Eva Janzer Memorial Award
American String Teachers Association National Distinguished Service Award
Music Teachers National Association Lifetime Achievement Award

References

External links
Death notice in USC News
Appreciation of Eleonore Schoenfeld
Interview at cello.org

1925 births
2007 deaths
Slovenian emigrants to the United States
Slovenian people of Polish descent
Slovenian people of Russian descent
German classical cellists
German women classical cellists
American classical cellists
American music educators
American women music educators
Musicians from Berlin
20th-century American musicians
20th-century classical musicians
20th-century German musicians
American women classical cellists
20th-century women musicians
20th-century American women musicians
20th-century German women
21st-century American women
20th-century cellists